Tarpan (English title: The Absolution) was a 1994 Indian Hindi drama film written and directed by K. Bikram Singh, and starring  Om Puri, Revathy, Dina Pathak, Manohar Singh and Mita Vashisht in lead roles. This directorial debut film was jointly produced by NFDC and Doordarshan. The film set in the 1940s, in a fictitious village in the Shekhavati region in Rajasthan, where no girl child survives beyond the age of seven. It deals with larger issues of communalism and caste system through four inter-related stories.

The film was screened at Moscow International Film Festival, Montreal World Film Festival, Chicago International Film Festival and Cairo International Film Festival.

Cast
 Om Puri 	as Jassu Kaka
 Revathy 	as Sumitra 
 Dina Pathak 	as Rammo
 Manohar Singh as Sarpanch (Thakur Bir Singh)
 Mita Vashisht as Lachmi
 Ravi Jhankal 	as  Joravar
 Savita Bajaj 	as Chintho Singh
 Virendra Saxena as Sukku Baba
 Rajendra Gupta 	as  Lakhan Singh
 Vijay Kashyap as Phattu
 Lalit Tiwari as Jeetu Thakur
 Pavan Malhotra 	as Dhannu
 Anang Desai      as  Pratap Singh
 Babita Bhardwaj as Ganga
 Pradeep Bhatnagar as Vaid
 Rekha Kanda 	as Vidya
 Madhvi Kaushik 	as Mrs. Jeetu
 Usha Nagar 	as Dhannu's mom
 Zahida Parveen 	as Santosh

Awards
 Aravindhan award for best debut director.

References

External links
 
 Tarpan (streaming Online) Cinemas of India (NFDC)

1994 films
Indian drama films
1990s Hindi-language films
Films about the caste system in India
Films set in Rajasthan
Films set in the 1940s
1994 directorial debut films
1994 drama films
Hindi-language drama films